Dargi may refer to:
 Dargi, Hormozgan
 Dargi, Kerman
 Dargi, Khuzestan